Tomáš Zajíc (born 12 August 1996) is a Czech professional footballer who plays as a forward for Baník Ostrava.

Club career 
He started his professional career at Slovácko. He made his senior league debut for them on 20 February 2015 in their Czech First League 1–2 home loss to Jablonec. He scored his first league goal in his second appearance, a 2–2 home draw against Dukla Prague on 6 August 2016, when he scored a late equalizer after coming on as a substitute. On 25 September 2017, he ended Slovácko's seven-hour goal drought by scoring another late equalizer, this time in a 1–1 draw at Liberec. On 31 August 2021, Zajíc was loaned out to Polish club Zagłębie Lubin. On 4 May 2022, his loan was terminated.

International career 
He represented the Czech Republic in the under-20 and under-21 youth categories.

References

External links 
 
 Tomáš Zajíc official international statistics
 
 Tomáš Zajíc profile on the 1. FC Slovácko official website

1996 births
Living people
People from Hodonín District
Association football forwards
Czech footballers
Czech Republic youth international footballers
Czech First League players
Ekstraklasa players
III liga players
1. FC Slovácko players
FC Baník Ostrava players
Zagłębie Lubin players
Czech expatriate footballers
Expatriate footballers in Poland
Czech expatriate sportspeople in Poland
Sportspeople from the South Moravian Region